King Corn may refer to:

 King Corn (film), a documentary examining the role of corn farming in American society
 "King Corn" (The West Wing), an episode of the television series The West Wing

See also
 King Kong (disambiguation)